Porchfield is a village in the civil parish of Calbourne, Newtown and Porchfield, on the Isle of Wight between Cowes and Yarmouth.

Porchfield has a village hall - see external link below - and the nearest church is the Church of the Holy Spirit, in Newtown. There are two bed and breakfasts in Porchfield, "Youngwoods Farm" and "The Ridings".

References

External links
Porchfield and Newtown Village Hall
Porchfield
Netguide to Porchfield on the Isle of Wight
Colemans Animal Farm website

Villages on the Isle of Wight